This is a list of the leaders of public universities in Malaysia, which comprises the Chancellor (as ceremonial leader), Chairman of the Board of Directors (as chairman) and the Vice Chancellor (as chief executive officer).

References

External links 
 Higher Education Department of Malaysia

See also 
 Universities in Malaysia
 Ministry of Higher Education

Vice-chancellors of universities in Malaysia
Malaysia